Andorra is a country in Europe.

Andorra may also refer to:

Places

Spain
 Andorra-Sierra de Arcos, a comarca in Aragon
 Andorra, a town and municipality in Province of Teruel, Spain

Elsewhere
 Andorra, Philadelphia, Pennsylvania, a neighborhood in Northwest Philadelphia
 Andorra la Vella, the capital of Andorra

Other
FC Andorra, a football club in Andorra la Vella, Andorra, that plays in the Spanish league system
 Andorra CF, a football team in Andorra, Teruel, Spain
 Andorra (album), a 2007 album by Caribou
 Andorra (novel), a 1997 novel by Peter Cameron
 Andorra (play), a play by Max Frisch
 Andorra (film), a 2019 film directed by Fred Schepisi

See also
 Andora, a town on the Italian Riviera 
 Endora (disambiguation)